The Clock of Flowing Time is a 13 meter high water clock extending over three floors in the Berlin Europa-Center. The clock was designed by the French artist Bernard Gitton and set up in 1982. 

The water clock displays the time by filling glass spheres with brightly colored liquid, in a cycle that repeats every 12 hours. The whole system is controlled by a pendulum swinging in the lower half of the clock.

References

External links 
 
 Official web page (archived in January 2019)
colored liquid video

Individual clocks
Water clocks
Buildings and structures in Charlottenburg-Wilmersdorf
Clocks in Germany
1982 establishments in Germany